Yaza Win Thein (born 9 April 1988) is a footballer from Myanmar. He made his first appearance for the Myanmar national football team in 2007.

Honours

Club
Myanmar National League(3):2011-2012-2013
MFF Cup(1): 2012

References 

1986 births
Living people
Burmese footballers
Myanmar international footballers
Yangon United F.C. players
Association football midfielders
Southeast Asian Games silver medalists for Myanmar
Southeast Asian Games medalists in football
Competitors at the 2007 Southeast Asian Games